Andrew Jackson (26 April 1856 – 3 December 1930) was a Scottish footballer who played as a full back or half back.

Career
Born in Airdrie, Jackson lived in Cambuslang for most of his life and played club football for Cambuslang, leading them to the 1888 Scottish Cup Final as captain, winning the Lanarkshire Cup and Glasgow Cup, and taking part in the inaugural season of the Scottish Football League in 1890. He retired the following year and was granted a benefit match with Cambuslang taking on a Scottish League XI.

He made two appearances for Scotland.

Personal life
His brother Jimmy (20 years younger), son Andy, and nephews James and Archie were also all footballers.

References

1856 births
1930 deaths
Scottish footballers
Scotland international footballers
Cambuslang F.C. players
Association football defenders
Association football wing halves
Footballers from Airdrie, North Lanarkshire
Sportspeople from Cambuslang
Footballers from South Lanarkshire